Meard Street is a street in Soho, London. It runs roughly east–west (properly, east-northeast to west-southwest, as elsewhere in Soho), between Wardour Street to the west and Dean Street to the east. It is in two sections, with a slight bend in the middle: the west half is pedestrianised, while the east half is a narrow, single-lane road.

The street is named after John Meard, the younger, a carpenter, later esquire, who developed it in the 1720s and 1730s.

15 Meard Street served as the exterior of the home occupied by characters played by Ian McKellen and Derek Jacobi in the 2013–16 ITV sitcom Vicious.

History 
The two halves occupy what were originally two separate, non-communicating 17th-century courts. They were developed in two halves: the western half, Meard's Court, in 1722, and the eastern half, Dean's Court (opening off Dean Street, and renamed Meard Street) in 1731/32. As part of the redevelopment of Dean's Court, the two halves were joined in 1732/33.

Notable occupants 
 Anne Pigalle, chanteuse, artiste and Soho club night creator, lived at number 4 from 1985 to 1990

 Batcave, birthplace of English goth subculture
 Sebastian Horsley (1962-2010), artist and dandy; number 7

See also 
 St. Anne's Court

References and sources
References

Sources

 

Streets in the City of Westminster
Streets in Soho